Priyathama is a 1966 Indian Malayalam-language film, directed and produced by P. Subramaniam. The film stars Prem Nazir, Sheela, Shanthi and Adoor Bhasi. The film had musical score by Br Lakshmanan.

Cast
Prem Nazir
Sheela
Shanthi
Adoor Bhasi
Thikkurissy Sukumaran Nair
Vaikkam Mani
Aranmula Ponnamma
 Kanchana (old)
Pankajavalli
S. P. Pillai

Soundtrack
The music was composed by Br Lakshmanan and the lyrics were written by Sreekumaran Thampi.

References

External links
 

1966 films
1960s Malayalam-language films
Films directed by P. Subramaniam
Films scored by Br Lakshmanan